Christos Dimitrakopoulos (born ) is a retired Greek male volleyball player. He was part of the Greece men's national volleyball team at the 2002 FIVB Volleyball Men's World Championship in Argentina. He played for Olympiacos and Panathinaikos.

Clubs
 Panathinaikos (2001-2003)
 Olympiacos (2003–2005)

References

1974 births
Living people
Greek men's volleyball players
Sportspeople from Kalamata
Olympiacos S.C. players
Panathinaikos V.C. players
PAOK V.C. players
Iraklis V.C. players
E.A. Patras players